The Lepidoptera of Nauru consist of both the butterflies and moths recorded from Nauru, an island country in Micronesia in the Central Pacific.

According to a recent estimate, there are a total of four butterfly species present in Nauru, none of which is endemic. The number of moth species is unknown.

Butterflies

Hesperiidae
Badamia exclamationis (Fabricius, 1775)

Lycaenidae
Petrelaea tombugensis (Rober, 1886)

Nymphalidae
Danaus plexippus (Linnaeus, 1758)
Hypolimnas bolina (Linnaeus, 1758)

Moths

Choreutidae
Choreutis orthogona (Meyrick, 1886)

Crambidae
Diaphania indica (Sanders, 1851)
Glyphodes multilinealis Kenrick, 1907
Parotis suralis (Lederer, 1863)
Spoladea recurvalis (Fabricius 1775)

Elachistidae
Ethmia nigroapicella (Saalmüller 1880)

Erebidae
Achaea janata (Linnaeus, 1758)
Anticarsia irrorata (Fabricius, 1781)
Eublemma anachoresis (Wallgreen, 1863)
Mocis frugalis (Fabricius, 1775)
Mocis trifasciata (Stephens 1829)

Gelechiidae
Trissodoris honorariella  (Walsingham, 1907)

Pterophoridae
Hepalastis pumilio (Zeller 1873)
Megalorhipida leucodactyla (Fabricius 1794)
Sphenarches anisodactylus  (Walker 1864)

Pyralidae
Etiella zinckenella  (Treitschke 1832)

Noctuidae
?Amyna axis  (Guenée, 1852)
Chrysodeixis eriosoma  (Doubleday 1843)
Spodoptera mauritia  (Boisduval 1833)
Stictoptera cucullioides  Guenée 1852

Nolidae
Westermannia superba (Hübner, 1823)

Sphingidae
Gnathothlibus erotus (Cramer, 1777)

Tineidae
Erechthias penicillata (Swezey, 1909)

Tortricidae
Cryptophlebia ombrodelta (Lower, 1898)

External links
First Records of Butterflies (Lepidoptera) from the Republic of Nauru
North, A. J., 1903. Notes on the zoology of Paanopa or Ocean Island and Nauru or Pleasant Island, Gilbert Group. Records of the Australian Museum 5(1): 1–15.; 14 April 1903
Rapid Biodiversity Assessment of REPUBLIC OF NAURU

Fauna of Nauru
Nauru
Nauru
Nauru
Nauru
Lists of biota of Nauru